William Phelps Greer III (July 8, 1936 – September 23, 1993), credited as William Cort and Bill Cort, was an American actor.

Cort appeared on several television shows. His most notable is Dusty's Trail from the early 1970s. He appeared on several other series including: Window on Main Street, Combat!,  The F.B.I., Little House on the Prairie, Family Ties, Starsky & Hutch, The Dukes of Hazzard, The Ropers, Lou Grant, One Day at a Time, The Practice, Dynasty, Hart to Hart, Three's Company, Hazel, The Golden Girls, The Bradys, Empty Nest, Dallas, Three's a Crowd, Murder, She Wrote, and Growing Pains, among many others.
He appeared in Elvira: Mistress of the Dark and Heathers in 1988, and 1990's Ghost, starring Patrick Swayze and Demi Moore.
He died at the age of 57 in 1993 of cancer.

Filmography

References

External links

1936 births
1993 deaths
Male actors from El Paso, Texas
American male television actors
American male film actors
20th-century American male actors
Deaths from cancer in California